Woodleaf is an unincorporated community in Napa County, California. It lies at an elevation of 390 feet (119 m).

References

Unincorporated communities in Napa County, California
Napa Valley
Unincorporated communities in California